Ayanna is a feminine given name. Notable people with the name include:

 Ayanna Alexander (born 1982), Trinidad and Tobago triple jumper
 Ayanna Dyette (1986–2018), Trinidad and Tobago volleyball player
 Ayanna Howard (born 1972), American roboticist and researcher
 Ayanna Hutchinson (born 1978), Trinidad and Tobago sprint athlete
 Ayanna McClean, Trinidad and Tobago field hockey defender and umpire
 Ayanna Oliva (born 1986), Filipina model, singer, and VJ
 Ayanna Pressley (born 1974), U.S. representative from Massachusetts
 Ayanna Witter-Johnson (born 1980s), British composer, singer, songwriter and cellist
 Charlotte Ayanna (born 1976), American actress and former Miss Teen USA

See also
 Ayana (name)

Feminine given names